= Navigraph =

Navigation tool for flight simulation

Navigraph KB
- Type: Private
- Industry: Flight Simulation
- Founder: Magnus Axholt; Stephen O'Connell
- Headquarters: Stockholm, Sweden
- Website: navigraph.com

Navigraph is a Swedish software company that specialises in flight simulation, working with Jeppesen to provide real-world navigational data to the flight simulation community.

== History ==
Navigraph was founded in 2003 by Magnus Axholt and Stephen O’Connell, after they became aware of the need for accurate aeronautical charts 'among the more serious enthusiasts in the flight simulation community'. In 2021, Navigraph acquired SimBrief, a popular flight planning tool within the flight simulation community.

== Products ==
=== Charts ===
Navigraph Charts is the company's flagship product that provides access to Jeppesen charts of over 7000 airports worldwide. Additionally, Navigraph provides an application where users can interactively navigate.

=== Navigation Data ===
Navigraph Navigation Data provides access to Jeppesen's 28-daily AIRAC cycle.

=== Flight Planning ===
Navigraph provides a freeware tool, SimBrief, to allow users to generate realistic routes for use in flight simulators. SimBrief is heavily integrated with Navigraph's other tools, with users being able to import routings to the charts application and update the tool's navigational data with Navigraph's subscription.
